NGC 497 is a barred spiral galaxy approximately 336 million light-years away from Earth in the constellation of Cetus. It was discovered by French astronomer Édouard Stephan on November 6, 1882.

NGC 497 was imaged by Halton Arp and included in his Atlas of Peculiar Galaxies as Arp 8, under the category of 'split arm' galaxies.

See also 
 List of NGC objects (1–1000)

References

External links 
 
 
 SEDS

Barred spiral galaxies
Cetus (constellation)
497
4992
915
8
Astronomical objects discovered in 1882
Discoveries by Édouard Stephan